The eleventh season of Food Paradise, an American food reality television series narrated by Jess Blaze Snider (formally Mason Pettit) on the Travel Channel, premiered on May 21, 2017. First-run episodes of the series aired in the United States on the Travel Channel on Mondays at 10:00 p.m. EDT. The season contained 15 episodes and concluded airing on August 20, 2017.

Food Paradise features the best places to find various cuisines at food locations across America. Each episode focuses on a certain type of restaurant, such as "Diners", "Bars", "Drive-Thrus" or "Breakfast" places that people go to find a certain food specialty.

Episodes 
Note: These episodes aired from May 21 - August 20, 2017.

Lay It On Thick

Handheld Happiness

Carb Overload

Donut Shop

Keepin' It Retro

Hey Butter Butter

Noodle Nirvana

Wild & Wacky

Food On Fire

Brain Freeze

Egg-Streme Eats

Destination Dining

Chow Down Meat Town

Worth The Wait

Bigger Is Better

References

External links
Food Paradise @Travelchannel.com

2017 American television seasons